The spotted laughingthrush (Ianthocincla ocellata) is a bird species in the family Leiothrichidae. It is found in Bhutan, China, India, Myanmar, and Nepal. Its natural habitat is subtropical or tropical moist montane forests.

The spotted laughingthrush was at one time placed in the genus Garrulax but following the publication of a comprehensive molecular phylogenetic study in 2018, it was moved to the resurrected genus Ianthocincla.

Gallery

References

External links
 Spotted laughingthrush videos on the Internet Bird Collection

spotted laughingthrush
Birds of North India
Birds of Nepal
Birds of Bhutan
Birds of Central China
Birds of Yunnan
spotted laughingthrush
Taxonomy articles created by Polbot
Taxobox binomials not recognized by IUCN